Robert Thomson (23 September 1903 – 28 December 1972) was a Scottish footballer who played for Falkirk, Sunderland, Newcastle United (moving between the Tyne–Wear derby clubs in an exchange deal with Bobby McKay as a potential replacement for Frank Hudspeth, losing his place to David Fairhurst after two seasons), Hull City, Olympique Marseille, Racing Club de Paris and Ipswich Town, and for the Scotland national team and the Scottish League XI.

After retiring as a player, Thomson worked for Ipswich Town as assistant trainer and head trainer, under Scott Duncan. He was also the manager of Dutch side Ajax from November 1950, when he succeeded Jack Reynolds, until his sacking on 4 December 1952.  During the Second World War he served in the Royal Air Force.

Personal life
Robert was born in Falkirk, the son of Agnes Wilson and William Thomson.

He was married to June Adele Manning.

References

Sources

External links

1903 births
1972 deaths
Scottish footballers
Association football fullbacks
Scotland international footballers
Falkirk F.C. players
Sunderland A.F.C. players
Newcastle United F.C. players
Hull City A.F.C. players
Ipswich Town F.C. players
Scottish Football League players
Scottish Football League representative players
English Football League players
Scottish expatriate footballers
Scottish expatriate football managers
Expatriate footballers in France
Racing Club de France Football players
Footballers from Falkirk
Expatriate football managers in the Netherlands
Scottish expatriate sportspeople in the Netherlands
AFC Ajax managers
Ipswich Town F.C. non-playing staff
Olympique de Marseille players
Scottish expatriate sportspeople in France
Royal Air Force personnel of World War II